Polymeridium rhodopruinosum is a species of corticolous (bark-dwelling), crustose lichen in the family Trypetheliaceae. Found in Puerto Rico, it was formally described as a new species in 2016 by Dutch lichenologist André Aptroot. The lichen has a white thallus lacking a cortex. The only lichen product detected from collected specimens using thin-layer chromatography was an anthraquinone compound. The combination of characteristics of the lichen that distinguish it from others in Polymeridium are the ascomata with external, red pruina that turn dark blood red with a K+ spot test; and the dimensions of its ascospores (17–19 by 4–5 μm).

References

Trypetheliaceae
Lichen species
Lichens described in 2016
Lichens of the Caribbean
Taxa named by André Aptroot